Doughboys is a 1930 American Pre-Code comedy film starring Buster Keaton. It was Keaton's second starring talkie vehicle  and has been called Keaton's "most successful sound Picture." A Spanish-language version was also made under the title, De Frente, Marchen.

Plot
Elmer (Buster Keaton), a member of the idle rich, is smitten by working girl Mary (Sally Eilers), who will have nothing to do with him. When Elmer's chauffeur gets caught up in an army recruitment drive and quits, Elmer goes to an employment agency to find a new driver and accidentally enlists in the army. Elmer learns that Mary is on the base to entertain the troops and learns that his drill sergeant, Brophy (Edward Brophy), is also interested in Mary.

Cast
 Buster Keaton as Elmer
 Sally Eilers as Mary
 Cliff Edwards as Nescopeck
 Edward Brophy as Sgt. Brophy
 Victor Potel as Svendenburg
 Arnold Korff as Gustav
 Frank Mayo as Captain Scott 
 Pitzy Katz as Abie Cohn 
 William Steele as Lieutenant Randolph 
 Edward Sedgwick as Guggleheimer the Camp Cook (uncredited)

Reception
Keaton had creative input in Doughboys, which was partly inspired by his own experience in World War I.  Although the writers kept inserting puns and verbal jokes into the script, Keaton insisted that his dialogue, at least, be less "jokey." Keaton felt that Doughboys was the best of the films he made for MGM.

References

External links
 
 
 
 
 Doughboys at the International Buster Keaton Society

1930 films
1930 comedy films
American comedy films
American black-and-white films
Military humor in film
Metro-Goldwyn-Mayer films
Films directed by Edward Sedgwick
Western Front (World War I) films
1930s English-language films
1930s American films
Films with screenplays by Richard Schayer